Philipp Emanuel von Fellenberg (27 June 1771 – 21 November 1844) was a Swiss educationalist and agronomist.

Biography
He was born at Bern. His father was of patrician family, and a man of importance in his canton, and his mother was a granddaughter of the Dutch admiral Van Tromp. From his mother and from Gottlieb Konrad Pfeffel, the blind poet of Colmar, he received a better education than falls to the lot of most boys, while the intimacy of his father with Pestalozzi gave to his mind that bent which it afterwards followed. In 1790 he entered the University of Tübingen, where he distinguished himself by his rapid progress in legal studies.

On account of his health he afterwards undertook a walking tour in Switzerland and the adjoining portions of France, Swabia and Tirol, visiting the hamlets and farmhouses, mingling in the labors and occupations of the peasants and mechanics, and partaking of their rude fare and lodging. After the downfall of Robespierre, he went to Paris and remained there long enough to be assured of the storm impending over his native country. This he did his best to avert, but his warnings were disregarded, and Switzerland was lost before any efficient means could be taken for its safety. Fellenberg, who had hastily raised a levy en masse, was proscribed; a price was set upon his head, and he was compelled to flee into Germany.

Shortly afterwards, however, he was recalled by his countrymen, and sent on a mission to Paris to remonstrate against the rapacity and cruelty of the agents of the French republic. But in this and other diplomatic offices which he held for a short time, he was witness to so much corruption and intrigue that his mind revolted from the idea of a political life, and he returned home with the intention of devoting himself wholly to the education of the young.

With this resolution he purchased in 1799 the estate of Hofwyl, near Bern, intending to make agriculture the basis of a new system which he had projected, for elevating the lower and rightly training the higher orders of the state, and welding them together in a closer union than had hitherto been deemed attainable. For some time he carried on his labors in conjunction with Pestalozzi, but incompatibility of disposition soon induced them to separate. The scheme of Fellenberg at first excited a large amount of ridicule, but gradually it began to attract the notice of foreign countries; and pupils, some of them of the highest rank, began to flock to him from every country in Europe, both for the purpose of studying agriculture and to profit by the high moral training which he associated with his educational system. For forty-five years Fellenberg, assisted by his wife, who ran the side of the school devoted to girls, continued his educational labors, and finally raised his institution to the highest point of prosperity and usefulness. He died in 1844.

Works 
1808: Landwirthschaftliche Blätter von Hofwyl. 5 Hefte. Aarau: Maurhofer & Dellenbach, 1808-1817
1813: Darstellung der Armen-rziehungsanstalt in Hofwyl. Von ihrem Stifter E. v. F. Aus dem vierten Hefte der landwirthschaftlichen Blätter von Hofwyl besonders abgedruckt. Aarau
1813: Observations extraites des feuilles d’Hofwyl, sur les semoirs à grains de toute espèce et leur emploi. [Bern?]
1808: Vues relatives à l'agriculture de la Suisse et aux moyens de la perfectionner; traduit de l'Allemand par C. Pictet. Genève
1811: Vorläufige Nachricht über die Erziehungsanstalt für die höheren Stände zu Hofwyl. [Berne]
1830: Beleuchtung einer weltgerichtlichen Frage an unsern Zeitgeist. Bern: bei C. A. Jenni (Reissued by Thoemmes Press, Bristol, 1994 ) 
1831: Sendschreiben an den Verfassungsrath des Kantons Bern, ... April 1831. Bern: Gedruckt bei Carl Rätzer
1833: Der dreimonatliche Bildungskurs, Bern

References
 This work in turn cites:
Hamm, Wilhelm von Fellenberg's Leben und Wirken: zur Erinnerung für seime Freunde, Schüler und Verehrer (Bern, 1845)
Schöni, Franz Robert Der Stifter von Hofwyl, Leben und Wirken Fellenberg's. Bern, 1871 & Schaffhausen, 1874

Further reading 
 H. Gilomen: Die Kinderkolonie Meikirch. Ein pädagogisches Experiment vor hundert Jahren. Beyer & Söhne, Langensalza 1929. (= Friedrich Mann's Pädagogisches Magazin. Heft 1245).
 Kurt Guggisberg: Philipp Emanuel von Fellenberg und sein Erziehungsstaat. Lang, Bern 1953.
 Rudolf Wepfer: "Ich bin auch das Werk meiner selbst". Philipp Emanuel von Fellenberg. Biographische Skizze eines Pioniers der Pädagogik und Kämpfers für ein freies Erziehungswesen. Verl. am Goetheanum, Dornach 2000. 
 Denise Wittwer Hesse: Die Familie von Fellenberg und die Schulen von Hofwyl. Erziehungsideale, "Häusliches Glück" und Unternehmertum einer Bernischen Patrizierfamilie in der ersten Hälfte des 19. Jahrhunderts. Historischer Verein, Bern 2002. (= Archiv des Historischen Vereins des Kantons Bern; 82) 

1771 births
1844 deaths
People from Bern
Swiss educators
Swiss nobility
Swiss people of Dutch descent